

Background
The Ship and Shovell is a Victorian pub in Craven Passage, Charing Cross, London. It may be unique for consisting of two separate buildings on either side of a street, connected underground by a shared cellar.

Its name has its origins in either the coal labourers who visited the nearby Coal Hole or Admiral Sir Cloudesley Shovell.

The two former terrace houses were built in 1731–33, but later refaced. It has been Grade II listed since 1970.

Until 1998 it was two separate pubs (The Shovell and The Ship) when the cellars were joined by a new tunnel under Craven Passage containing the kitchen.

It is run by the Dorset family brewers Hall and Woodhouse.

References

External links
 
 

Grade II listed pubs in the City of Westminster